María de la Purísima Salvat Romero (20 February 1926 – 31 October 1998), born María Isabel Salvat Romero, was a Spanish Roman Catholic nun and a member of the . She assumed the name of "María de la Purísima of the Cross" after she entered that order. Romero was the successor of Angela of the Cross of the latter's congregation and was known for her firmness in the progress of the order and in their role as servants of God and His people. Romero was known in her order for her strong commitment to uphold the magisterium of the Church.

She was beatified on 18 September 2010 in Seville and a second miracle approved in 2015 paved the path for her eventual canonization. She was proclaimed a saint on 18 October 2015. As of 2015, with her death in 1998, she remains the fastest canonized saint proclaimed as such in recent times, with the exception of Pope John Paul II.

Life
María de la Purísima Salvat Romero was born in 1926 in Spain to Ricardo Salvat Albert and Margarita Romero Ferrer as the third of eight children.

She was baptized the following day with the name of "Maria Isabel" bestowed upon her in the church of Our Lady of the Conception on Goya Street. As a child she attended the school of the Irish Sisters in Madrid and received her First Communion at the age of six.

Romero and her family left Spain for Portugal from July 1936 to 1938 in order to escape the persecutions of the Spanish Civil War; they returned following the conclusion of the conflict. During her time in Portugal, she realized her true calling was to that of religious life. While her mother approved of this decision, her father ultimately attempted to suppress this, though later relented to the strong desire of his daughter.

Romero later made her temporary vows on 27 June 1947 and took her perpetual vows on 9 December 1952.

In 1966 she was sent to the Mother House of the congregation in Seville where she, in 1968, was named the Provincial of the Mother House. She eventually ascended to the position of Superior General in 1977 and was reelected thrice, remaining in office until her death.

During her tenure, she oversaw the updating of the Constitution while attempting during her term to defend and uphold the charism of the congregation. She continued to safeguard the charism while focusing on a renewed fidelity to the message of the Gospel and the magisterium of the Catholic Church, as well as an added emphasis on Marian and Eucharistic devotion. Romero also met with the sick and the poor each morning, working tirelessly for them in terms of serving them food and cleaning their clothes. In her role as Mother General she attended the beatification of Angela of the Cross by Pope John Paul II on 5 November 1982.

She was diagnosed with a tumor in 1994 and she faced her illness for the next four years with great docility to the will of God. Romero died in Seville on 31 October 1998.

Canonization

Diocesan process and declaration as Venerable
The canonization process commenced with the declaration of "nihil obstat" (nothing against) on 13 January 2004 which bestowed upon her the title of Servant of God. The cause opened in Seville and the local process spanned from 20 February 2004 until 15 November 2004. The process was validated on 2 July 2005.

The Positio – documentation on her life of heroic virtue – was forwarded to the Congregation for the Causes of Saints in 2006 which allowed for Pope Benedict XVI to declare her as Venerable on 17 January 2009 after recognizing that she had lived a model life of heroic virtue – the requirement for being granted this posthumous title.

Beatification
A miracle attributed to her intercession was investigated on a local level that spanned from 4 November 2005 to 13 February 2006, and was validated on 13 December 2006. Pope Benedict XVI approved the miracle on 27 March 2010, paving the path for her beatification. The miracle involved the curing of Ana Maria Rodriguez Casado who was cured at the age of three in 2004 after being in a vegetative state; the girl celebrated her First Communion at the beatification Mass.

Cardinal Angelo Amato celebrated the beatification on 18 September 2010.

Canonization
A second miracle attributed to her intercession was investigated and was validated on 13 December 2013. It underwent careful scrutiny in a local process in 2013, and proceeded to a unanimous and positive decision on the part of the medical board in Rome on 6 November 2014; it also received the unanimous approval of theologians on 20 January 2015 and the Congregation María de la Purísima Salvat Romero for the Causes of Saints on 12 February 2015. On 5 May 2015, Pope Francis approved the miracle, which allowed for her to be canonized. A date was set for her canonization; it was determined at a consistory on 27 June 2015 and she was canonized as a saint of the Catholic Church on 18 October 2015.

Feast
In 2010 on the occasion of her beatification it was announced that her feast would be celebrated on an annual basis on 31 October.

On 14 August 2015, prior to the canonization, it was announced that the Congregation for Divine Worship and the Discipline of the Sacraments – in consultation with the Archdiocese of Seville – designated 18 September (the date of her beatification) as the official feast of Romero instead of 31 October.

References

External links
Hagiography Circle
Saints SQPN
Madre Maria del Purisima

1926 births
1998 deaths
20th-century venerated Christians
20th-century Spanish nuns
Beatifications by Pope Benedict XVI
Canonizations by Pope Francis
Spanish Roman Catholic saints
People from Madrid
Venerated Catholics by Pope Benedict XVI